The 1844 United States presidential election in Tennessee took place between November 1 and December 4, 1844, as part of the 1844 United States presidential election. Voters chose 13 representatives, or electors to the Electoral College, who voted for President and Vice President.

Despite being Polk's home state and the state he once served as the governor of, Tennessee voted for the Whig candidate, Henry Clay, over Democratic candidate James K. Polk. Clay won Tennessee by a very narrow margin of 123 votes (0.10%). James K. Polk is one of 4 presidents to lose his residential state in a successful presidential bid. The others are Woodrow Wilson, Richard Nixon, and Donald Trump.

Results

References

Tennessee
1844
1844 Tennessee elections